Aglossa ocellalis is a species of snout moth in the genus Aglossa. It was described by Julius Lederer in 1863 and is known from Uganda and the Democratic Republic of the Congo. There is one record of an accidental introduction from Scotland.

References

Moths described in 1863
Pyralini
Moths of Africa